AWV may refer to:

 Amalgamated Wireless Valve Co., part of Amalgamated Wireless (Australasia)
 Association of Writers of Vojvodina, a writing association in Vojvodina, Serbia
 Alain-Werke-Verzeichnis, a system for cataloging the works of Jehan Alain
 Alaskan Way Viaduct, an elevated road in Seattle, Washington, United States